Douar Ouled Kheira (Arabic: ضووار ووليد خهييرا) is a village under administration of Sidi Boussaid in Mascara Province, Algeria. Douar Ouled Kheira has 49 buildings and 8 roads according to Google Maps.

References 

Villages in Algeria
Populated places in Mascara Province